Jikryeong, sometimes written as jikryung or jingnyeong and also known as jikryeongpo, is a type of po with a straight neckline. It could be worn as an outwear by men and was sometimes worn under the danryeong. The jikryeong was worn in ordinary times and was worn all year round. It was also worn as a mourning attire during the Joseon period. Following the Japanese invasion (1592–1598), its usage as an outerwear decreased and was more often used as an undergarment. After the latter half of the 17th century, the jikryeong was turned into an inner lining for the danryeong, thus turning to a single lined garment.

Design and construction 
The collar of the jikryeong as its name indicate is straight collar, closing to the right side. It may also come with rectangular side panels (무, moo) on each side of the robe.

Textile and colour 
The jikryeong could be unlined, lined, and padded. It was natural raw hemp white in colour when used as a mourning attire.

Similar-looking garments 

 Durumagi: the jikryeong resembles the durumagi.
 Zhishen (jikshin 直身/직신), jikryeong is almost the same as the Chinese zhishen.
 Zhijupao (直裾袍)

See also 

 Hanbok
 Po
 Paofu

References

External links 

Korean clothing